Isabel Oyarzábal Smith (12 June 1878 in Málaga, Andalusia, Spain – 28 May 1974 Mexico City) was a Spanish-born journalist, writer, actress and diplomat, also known as Isabel de Palencia.

Biography
She had a Scottish mother, Anne Guthrie. Oyarzábal's first position was of a Spanish language instructor in Sussex, England. After the death of her father, she met Ceferino Palencia, the son of actress María Tubau. Oyarzábal told Palencia of her desire of becoming an actress and Palencia cast her for the play Pepita Tudó. She kept writing and with her friend Raimunda Avecilla and her sister Ana Oyarzábal she edited the magazine La Dama y la Vida Ilustrada. She was also a reporter for the Laffan News Bureau (a minor rival to Associated Press) and the newspaper The Standard. In 1909 she married Palencia and then collaborated for the Spanish magazines Blanco y Negro, El Heraldo, Nuevo Mundo and La Esfera.

In 1926, she wrote a Spanish folklore book titled El traje regional de España (The Regional Costumes of Spain). In 1930 she became the only female in the Slavery Permanent Commission of the League of Nations.

During the Spanish Civil War she was a spokesperson for the Republic and called for the repeal of the international Non-Intervention Agreement at a UK Labour Party meeting in October 1936 in Edinburgh, Scotland where she met and influenced Jennie Lee, a Labour activist who later visited Spain to report on the war. She was appointed Ambassador to Sweden for the Republic towards the end of 1936.

In 1939, she relocated with her family to Mexico where she kept writing and died in 1974.

References

External links
  Andalusian women 

1878 births
1974 deaths
People from Málaga
Spanish stage actresses
Spanish journalists
Spanish women writers
Exiles of the Spanish Civil War in Mexico
Spanish people of Scottish descent
Spanish women in politics
Spanish feminists
Spanish women journalists
Folklorists
Women folklorists
Women in Red 2019
20th-century Spanish women
Ambassadors of Spain to Sweden